Cynthia L. Eckert (born October 27, 1965, in Evanston, Illinois) is an American rower.

References 
 
 

1965 births
Living people
Sportspeople from Evanston, Illinois
Rowers at the 1988 Summer Olympics
Rowers at the 1992 Summer Olympics
Olympic silver medalists for the United States in rowing
American female rowers
World Rowing Championships medalists for the United States
Medalists at the 1992 Summer Olympics
21st-century American women